Stråholmen is a small island off the coast of Kragerø and Bamble in southern Telemark, Norway. The island is about 1.5 km long and 1 km wide at the widest, and lies approximately 2 km north of the island Jomfruland. Stråholmen faces the Skagerrak seas to the east and provides shelter for the inner coast line. The name is Norwegian and literally translates to "The Islet of Straws".

History and settlement 
At the center of the island lies a small settlement which today consists of cottages a leisure homes, populated mainly through the summer. The settlement on Stråholmen was originally created by the sailing ship piloting industry of the southern Telemark area, as the location is great for spotting ships arriving from the sea. By the late 1900s the settlement has lost its economical function as except for some sparse agricultural activity. The remainders of the settlement is considered an important part of the cultural inheritance of the shipping industry era of the southern Telemark district.

Facilities and nature 
On the north side lies a sheltered dock and beach, frequently utilized as a recreation area for the local population and tourists. The dock is accessible by water taxi from nearby Kragerø, Valle (in Bamble) or Langesund, or by private vessel. The central settlement is reachable from the dock by a dirt path.

Stråholmen features several plants and tree types which are quite uncommon in the area, which were probably imported through seeds in ballast dirt during the shipping era. The island is great for hiking and the surrounding shores are considered good for sports fishing.

The bird life is rich, especially during the migration seasons. Ducks, geese and wading birds are especially abundant.

Islands of Vestfold og Telemark